The 1983–84 Scottish Inter-District Championship was a rugby union competition for Scotland's district teams.

This season saw the 31st Scottish Inter-District Championship. 

South won the competition with 4 wins.

1983-84 League Table

Results

Round 1

Glasgow District: 

Anglo-Scots:

Round 2

North and Midlands: 

Glasgow District:

Anglo-Scots: 

Edinburgh District:

Round 3

South: 

North and Midlands:

Round 4

Glasgow District: 

Edinburgh District: 

Anglo-Scots: 

South:

Round 5

Edinburgh District: 

South: 

North and Midlands: 

Anglo-Scots:

Round 6

Edinburgh District: 

North and Midlands: 

South: 

Glasgow District:

Matches outwith the Championship

Trial matches

Blues: 

Whites:

References

1983–84 in Scottish rugby union
1983–84